Paris is a common setting in both French and American films. This is a list of films set in Paris:

French cinema

1890s
Excursion automobile Paris-Meulan (1896), by Auguste and Louis Lumière

1910s
Fantômas (1913), by Louis Feuillade
Les Vampires (1915), by Louis Feuillade

1920s
Entr'acte (1924), by René Clair
L'Inhumaine (1924), by Marcel L'Herbier
Paris Qui Dort (1925), by René Clair
Belphégor (1927), by Henri Desfontaines
Napoléon (1927), by Abel Gance
L'Argent (1928), by Marcel L'Herbier

1930s
Accusée, levez-vous ! (1930), by Maurice Tourneur
Sous les toits de Paris (1930), by René Clair
Allô Berlin ? Ici Paris ! (1931), by Julien Duvivier
La Chienne (1931), by Jean Renoir
Au nom de la loi (1932), by Maurice Tourneur
Boudu sauvé des eaux (1932), by Jean Renoir
La Petite Chocolatière (1932), by Marc Allégret
Les Deux Orphelines (1933), by Maurice Tourneur
L'Atalante (1934), by Jean Vigo
La crise est finie (1934), by Robert Siodmak
Mauvaise Graine (1934), by Billy Wilder and Alexander Esway
Le Roi des Champs-Élysées (1934), by Yves Mirande
Zouzou (1934), by Marc Allégret
La Bandera (1935), by Julien Duvivier
Les Mystères de Paris (1935), by Félix Gandéra
Princesse Tam Tam (1935), by Edmond T. Gréville
La belle équipe (1936), by Julien Duvivier
Le roman d'un tricheur (1936), by Sacha Guitry
Les Rois du sport (1937), by Pierre Colombier
Hôtel du Nord (1938), by Marcel Carné
La Maison du Maltais (1938), by Pierre Chenal
Orage (1938), by Marc Allégret
Remontons les Champs-Élysées (1938), by Sacha Guitry
Derrière la façade (1939), by Georges Lacombe and Yves Mirande
Fric-Frac (1939), by Maurice Lehmann and Claude Autant-Lara
Le Jour se lève (1939), by Marcel Carné

1940s
Battement de coeur (1940), by Henri Decoin
L'Assassin habite au 21 (1942), by Henri-Georges Clouzot
La Nuit fantastique (1942), by Maurice L'Herbier
Au Bonheur des Dames (1943), by André Cayatte
Les Mystères de Paris (1943), by Jacques de Baroncelli
Les dames du Bois de Boulogne (1945), by Robert Bresson
Les Enfants du paradis (1945), by Marcel Carné
Falbalas (1945), by Jacques Becker
Les Portes de la nuit (1945), by Marcel Carné
Antoine et Antoinette (1947), by Jacques Becker
Par la fenêtre (1947), by Gilles Grangier
Les Parents terrible (1947), by Jean Cocteau
Quai des Orfèvres (1947), by Henri-Georges Clouzot
Le Cœur sur la main (1949), by André Berthomieu
Fantômas contre Fantômas (1949), by Robert Vernay
Manon (1949), by Henri-Georges Clouzot
Orphée (1949), by Jean Cocteau
Rendez-vous de juillet (1949), by Jacques Becker

1950s

1951
Les Enfants Terribles, by Jean-Pierre Melville
Garou-Garou, le passe-muraille, by Jean Boyer
La Poison, by Sacha Guitry
...Sans laisser d'adresse, by Jean-Paul Le Chanois
Seul dans Paris, by Hervé Bromberger
Sous le ciel de Paris, by Julien Duvivier

1952
C'est arrivé à Paris, by Henri Lavorel and John Berry
Casque d'or, by Jacques Becker
La Fête à Henriette, by Julien Duvivier
Monsieur Taxi, by André Hunebelle

1953
Bonjour Paris !, by Jean Image
Madame de..., by Max Ophüls
Minuit quai de Bercy, by Christian Stengel

1954
L'Air de Paris, by Marcel Carné
Crainquebille, by Ralph Habib
French Cancan, by Jean Renoir

1955
Les Chiffonniers d'Emmaüs, by Robert Darène
Du rififi chez les hommes, by Jules Dassin
Le Fil à la patte, by Guy Lefranc
Razzia sur la chnouf, by Henri Decoin
Sophie et le crime, by Pierre Gaspard-Huit

1956
The Red Balloon, by Albert Lamorisse
Bob le flambeur, by Jean-Pierre Melville
Ce soir les jupons volent, by Dimitri Kirsanoff
Gervaise, by René Clément
Notre-Dame de Paris, by Jean Delannoy
Paris, Palace Hôtel, by Henri Verneuil
Si Paris nous était conté, by Sacha Guitry
La Traversée de Paris, by Claude Autant-Lara
Voici le temps des assassins, by Julien Duvivier

1957
Pot-Bouille, by Julien Duvivier

1958
Les Amants, by Louis Malle
Ascenseur pour l'échafaud, by Louis Malle
En cas de malheur, by Claude Autant-Lara
Les Misérables, by Jean-Paul Le Chanois
Mon Oncle, by Jacques Tati
Sois belle et tais-toi, by Marc Allégret
Les Tricheurs, by Marcel Carné

1959
125, rue Montmartre, by Gilles Grangier
Marie-Octobre, by Julien Duvivier
Pickpocket, by Robert Bresson
Les Quatre Cents Coups, by François Truffaut

1960s

1960
À bout de souffle, by Jean-Luc Godard
Le Capitan, by André Hunebelle
Les Héritiers, by Jean Laviron
Le huitième jour, by Marcel Hanoun
Pierrot la tendresse, by François Villiers
Tirez sur le pianiste, by François Truffaut
La Vérité, by Henri-Georges Clouzot
Le Voyage en ballon, by Albert Lamorisse
Zazie dans le métro, by Louis Malle

1961
Le Capitaine Fracasse, by Pierre Gaspard-Huit
Une femme est une femme, by Jean-Luc Godard
Paris nous appartient, by Jacques Rivette

1962
Adieu Philippine, by Jacques Rozier
Cléo de 5 à 7, by Agnès Varda
Jules and Jim, by François Truffaut
Les Mystères de Paris, by André Hunebelle
Pourquoi Paris ?, by Denys de la Patellière
Vie privée, by Louis Malle
Vivre sa vie, by Jean-Luc Godard

1963
À cause, à cause d'une femme, by Michel Deville
Dragées au poivre, by Jacques Baratier
Peau de banane, by Marcel Ophüls

1964
Cherchez l'idole, by Michel Boisrond
Fantômas, by André Hunebelle
Un gosse de la butte, by Maurice Delbez
Lucky Jo, by Michel Deville
Monsieur, by Jean-Paul Le Chanois
La Peau Douce, by François Truffaut
Thomas l'imposteur, by Georges Franju

1965
Alphaville: Une étrange aventure de Lemmy Caution, by Jean-Luc Godard
L’Amour à la mer, by Guy Gilles
Compartiment tueurs, by Costa-Gavras
Le Corniaud, by Gérard Oury
Les Deux Orphelines, by Riccardo Freda
Du rififi à Paname, by Denys de La Patellière
Fantômas se déchaîne, by André Hunebelle
La Grosse Caisse, by Alex Joffé
La jetée, by Chris Marker
Paris vu par..., Anthology film
Pierrot le fou, by Jean-Luc Godard

1966
La Grande Vadrouille, by Gérard Oury
La guerre est finie, by Alain Resnais
Masculin, féminin, by Jean-Luc Godard
Paris brûle-t-il?, by René Clément

1967
Belle de jour, by Luis Buñuel
La Chinoise, by Jean-Luc Godard
Play Time, by Jacques Tati
Sept fois femme, by Vittorio De Sica
Le voleur, by Louis Malle

1968
Baisers volés, by François Truffaut
Les Biches, by Claude Chabrol
La Blonde de Pékin, by Nicolas Gessner
, by Denys de La Patellière

1969
L'Armée des ombres, by Jean-Pierre Melville
Le Cerveau, by Gérard Oury
Le Clan des Siciliens, by Henri Verneuil

1970s

1970
Le Cercle rouge, by Jean-Pierre Melville
Domicile Conjugal, by François Truffaut
La Liberté en croupe, by Édouard Molinaro

1971
Les Amis, by Gérard Blain
Le Bateau sur l'herbe, by Gérard Brach
Les Deux Anglaises et le Continent, by François Truffaut

1972
Le Grand Blond avec une chaussure noire, by Yves Robert

1973
Les Aventures de Rabbi Jacob, by Gérard Oury
Le Magnifique, by Philippe de Broca
La Maman et la Putain, by Jean Eustache
Prêtres interdits, by Denys de La Patellière

1974
Céline et Julie vont en bateau, by Jacques Rivette
Les Chinois à Paris, by Jean Yanne
Les Guichets du Louvre, by Michel Mitrani
Stavisky, by Alain Resnais
Touche pas à la femme blanche !, by Marco Ferreri

1975
Daguerréotypes, by Agnès Varda
Les Ambassadeurs, by Naceur Ktari
Peur sur la ville, by Henri Verneuil

1976
L'aile ou la cuisse, by Claude Zidi
C'était un rendez-vous by Claude Lelouch
Un éléphant ça trompe énormément, by Yves Robert

1977
La Vie devant soi, by Moshé Mizrahi

1978
La Carapate, by Gérard Oury
Lady Oscar, by Jacques Demy
Tendre poulet, by Philippe de Broca
Violette Nozière, by Claude Chabrol

1979
L'amour en fuite, by François Truffaut
Clair de femme, by Costa-Gavras

1980s

1980
La Boum, by Claude Pinoteau
Le Coup du parapluie, by Gérard Oury
Le Dernier Métro, by François Truffaut
Diva, by Jean-Jacques Beineix
La Femme de l'aviateur, by Éric Rohmer
Inspecteur la Bavure, by Claude Zidi
Les Sous-doués, by Claude Zidi

1981
Une étrange affaire, by Pierre Granier-Deferre
Le Pont du Nord, by Jacques Rivette
Le Professionnel, by Georges Lautner
Les Sous-doués en vacances, by Claude Zidi

1982
La Balance, by Bob Swaim
La Boum 2, by Claude Pinoteau
Les Misérables, by Robert Hossein
La Nuit de Varennes, by Ettore Scola
La Passante du Sans-Souci, by Jacques Rouffio
Tout feu, tout flamme, by Jean-Paul Rappeneau

1983
Banzaï, by Claude Zidi
Danton, by Andrzej Wajda
Le Marginal, by Jacques Deray
À nos amours, by Maurice Pialat
Signes extérieurs de richesse, by Jacques Monnet
Tchao Pantin, by Claude Berri

1984
Marche à l'ombre, by Michel Blanc
Mesrine, by André Génovès
Les Nuits de la pleine lune, by Eric Rohmer
Paroles et musique, by Elie Chouraqui
Pinot simple flic, by Gérard Jugnot
Les Ripoux, by Claude Zidi
Le Sang des autres, by Claude Chabrol
Souvenirs, souvenirs, by Ariel Zeitoun

1985
Autour de minuit, by Bertrand Tavernier
A nous les garçons, by Michel Lang
Rendez-vous, by André Téchiné
Scout toujours..., by Gérard Jugnot
Subway, by Luc Besson
Trois hommes et un couffin, by Coline Serreau

1986
Autour de minuit, by Bertrand Tavernier
Mélo, by Alain Resnais
Nuit d'ivresse, by Bernard Nauer

1987
, by Gérard Oury
Urgences, by Raymond Depardon

1988
Fréquence meurtre, by Élisabeth Rappeneau
Itinéraire d'un enfant gâté, by Claude Lelouch
La vie est un long fleuve tranquille (1988), by Étienne Chatiliez

1989
I Want to Go Home, by Alain Resnais
Love Without Pity, by Éric Rochant
La Révolution française, by Robert Enrico and Richard T. Heffron
My New Partner II, by Claude Zidi
, by Alexandre Arcady

1990s

1990
Cyrano de Bergerac, by Jean-Paul Rappeneau
La Discrète, by Christian Vincent
La Femme Nikita, by Luc Besson
Tatie Danielle, by Étienne Chatiliez

1991
Les Amants du Pont-Neuf, by Leos Carax
La double vie de Véronique, by Krzysztof Kieslowski
Une époque formidable, by Gérard Jugnot
J'embrasse pas, by André Téchiné
L'Opération Corned-Beef, by Jean-Marie Poiré
Paris s'éveille, by Olivier Assayas
La Totale!, by Claude Zidi

1992
Un cœur en hiver, by Claude Sautet
L. 627, by Bertrand Tavernier
Les Nuits fauves, by Cyril Collard

1993
Trois Couleurs : Bleu, by Krzysztof Kieslowski

1994
Bonsoir, by Jean-Pierre Mocky
Grosse Fatigue, by Michel Blanc
L'Histoire du garçon qui voulait qu'on l'embrasse, by Philippe Harel
Un indien dans la ville, by Hervé Palud
Le Péril jeune, by Cédric Klapisch
La Reine Margot, by Patrice Chéreau

1995
Les Anges gardiens, by Jean-Marie Poiré
La Fille seule, by Benoît Jacquot
La Haine, by Mathieu Kassovitz
Haut bas fragile, by Jacques Rivette
Les Trois Frères, by Didier Bourdon and Bernard Campan.

1996
L'Appartement, by Gilles Mimouni
Beaumarchais, l'insolent, by Édouard Molinaro
La Belle Verte, by Coline Serreau
Chacun cherche son chat, by Cédric Klapisch
Le Fils de Gascogne, by Pascal Aubier
Le Jaguar, by Francis Veber
Pédale douce, by Gabriel Aghion
Salut cousin !, by Merzak Allouache

1997
Le Cousin, by Alain Corneau
Le Dîner de Cons, by Francis Veber
Dobermann, by Jan Kounen
Jeunesse, by Noël Alpi
On connaît la chanson, by Alain Resnais
Le Pari, by Didier Bourdon and Bernard Campan
Quatre Garçons pleins d'avenir Jean-Paul, by Jean-Paul Lilienfeld
Soleil, by Roger Hanin
La Vérité si je mens!, by Thomas Gilou

1998
Didier, by Alain Chabat
L'École de la chair, by Benoît Jacquot
L'Ennui, by Alberto Moravia
Louise (Take 2), by Siegfried
Place Vendôme, by Nicole Garcia
Vénus Beauté (Institut), by Tonie Marshall
Vive la mariée... et la libération du Kurdistan, by Hiner Saleem

1999
La Fille sur le pont, by Patrice Leconte
Peut-être, by Cédric Klapisch
La Bûche, by Danièle Thompson
La vie ne me fait pas peur, by Noémie Lvovsky

2000s

2000
30 ans, by Laurent Perrin
Code inconnu : Récit incomplet de divers voyages, by Michael Haneke
Cours toujours, by Dante Desarthe
Deuxième vie, by Patrick Braoudé
Le goût des autres, by Agnès Jaoui
Sous le sable, by François Ozon
Taxi 2, by Gérard Krawczyk
La Tour Montparnasse infernale, by Charles Némès

2001
Absolument fabuleux, by Gabriel Aghion
Chaos, by Colinne Serreau
La Chambre des officiers, by François Dupeyron
Le Doux Amour des hommes, by Jean-Paul Civeyrac
Le Fabuleux Destin d'Amélie Poulain, by Jean-Pierre Jeunet
Le Placard, by Francis Veber
Les Rois mages, by Didier Bourdon
Va savoir, by Jacques Rivette
Sur mes lèvres, by Jacques Audiard
Tanguy, by Étienne Chatiliez
La Vérité si je mens ! 2, by Thomas Gilou
Vidocq, by Pitof
Wasabi, by Gérard Krawczyk
Yamakasi, by Ariel Zeitoun and Julien Seri

2002
Ah! Si j'étais riche, by Gérard Bitton and Michel Munz
Une affaire privée, by Guillaume Nicloux
Le Boulet, by Alain Berbérian and Frédéric Forestier
Demonlover, by Olivier Assayas
À la folie... pas du tout, by Laetitia Colombani
La Guerre à Paris, by Yolande Zauberman
Irréversible, by Gaspar Noé
Décalage Horaire, by Danièle Thompson
Ma femme s'appelle Maurice, Jean-Marie Poiré
Mauvais esprit, by Patrick Alessandrin
La Mentale, by Boursinhac
Monsieur Batignole, by Gérard Jugnot
Le Nouveau Jean-Claude, by Didier Tronchet
Papillons de nuit, by John Pepper
Vendredi soir, by Claire Denis

2003
18 ans après, by Coline Serreau
7 ans de mariage, by Didier Bourdon
Le Bison (et sa voisine Dorine), by Isabelle Nanty
Bon voyage, by Jean-Paul Rappeneau
Chouchou, by Merzak Allouache
Filles uniques, by Pierre Jolivet
Histoire de Marie et Julien, by Jacques Rivette
Laisse tes mains sur mes hanches, by Chantal Lauby
Monsieur Ibrahim et les Fleurs du Coran, by François Dupeyron
Pars vite et reviens tard, by Régis Wargnier
Ripoux 3, by Claude Zidi
Rire et Châtiment, by Isabelle Doval
Son frère, by Patrice Chéreau
Tais-toi !, by Francis Veber
Toutes ces belles promesses, by Jean-Paul Civeyrac
The Triplets of Belleville (Les Triplettes de Belleville), by Sylvain Chomet

2004
36 Quai des Orfèvres, by Olivier Marchal
Agents secrets, by Frédéric Schoendoerffer
Arsène Lupin, by Jean-Paul Salomé
L'Esquive, by Abdellatif Kechiche
L'Incruste, by Alexandre Castagnetti and Corentin Julius
Un long dimanche de fiançailles, by Jean-Pierre Jeunet
Mensonges et trahisons et plus si affinités..., by Laurent Tirard
Nathalie..., by Anne Fontaine
Les Parisiens, by Claude Lelouch
Pédale dure, by Gabriel Aghion
Triple Agent, by Eric Rohmer
Une vie à t’attendre, by Thierry Klifa

2005
Angel-A, by Luc Besson
Les Amants réguliers, by Philippe Garrel
Anthony Zimmer, by Jérôme Salle
, by Michel Deville
Une aventure, by Xavier Giannoli
Babel el web, by Merzak Allouache
De battre mon cœur s'est arrêté, by Jacques Audiard
La Boîte noire, by Richard Berry
Caché, by Michael Haneke
Combien tu m'aimes?, by Bertrand Blier
Le courage d'aimer, by Claude Lelouch
L'Empire des loups, by Chris Nahon
Gabrielle, by Patrice Chéreau
Gentille, by Sophie Fillières
La Moustache, by Emmanuel Carrère
Les Parrains, by Frédéric Forestier
Le Petit Lieutenant, by Xavier Beauvois
Les Poupées Russes, by Cédric Klapisch
Le Promeneur du Champ de Mars, by Robert Guédiguian
L’un reste, l’autre part, by Claude Berri
Sauf le respect que je vous dois, by Fabienne Godet
Tout pour plaire, by Cécile Telerman
À travers la forêt, by Jean-Paul Civeyrac

2006
 Les Amants du Flore, by Ilan Duran Cohen
Les Brigades du Tigre, by Jérôme Cornuau
Cabaret Paradis, by Shirley & Dino
Coeurs, by Alain Resnais
Dans Paris, by Christophe Honoré
La Doublure, by Francis Veber
Fauteuils d'orchestre, by Danièle Thompson
Il est plus facile pour un chameau..., by Valeria Bruni Tedeschi
Je pense à vous, by Pascal Bonitzer
Jean-Philippe, by Laurent Tuel
L'Ivresse du pouvoir, by Claude Chabrol
Mon meilleur ami, by Patrice Leconte
Ne le dis à personne, by Guillaume Canet
Prête-moi ta main, by Eric Lartigau
Renaissance, Christian Volckman
Le Sable, by Mario Feroce
La Science des rêves, by Michel Gondry

2007
99 Francs, by Jan Kounen
Un baiser s'il vous plaît, by Emmanuel Mouret
Boarding Gate, by Olivier Assayas
Les Chansons d'amour, by Christophe Honoré
Le Deuxième Souffle, by Alain Corneau
Dialogue avec mon jardinier, by Jean Becker
Ensemble, c'est tout, by Claude Berri
Molière, by Laurent Tirard
La Môme, by Olivier Dahan
Paris, by Cédric Klapisch
Le Prix à payer, by Alexandra Leclère
Roman de Gare, by Claude Lelouch
Les Toits de Paris, by Hiner Saleem
Une vieille maîtresse, by Catherine Breillat

2008
Agathe Cléry, by Etienne Chatiliez
Bouquet final, by Michel Delgado
De l'autre côté du lit, by Pascale Pouzadoux
Entre les murs, by Laurent Cantet
Faubourg 36, by Christophe Barratier
LOL (Laughing Out Loud), by Lisa Alessandrin
Mesrine : L’instinct de mort / L’ennemi public n°1, by Jean-François Richet
Modern Love, by Stéphane Kazandjia
Les plages d'Agnès, by Agnès Varda
Le Plaisir de chanter, by Ilan Duran Cohen
Sagan, by Diane Kurys
Seuls Two, by Ramzy Bédia and Éric Judor
Le Transporteur 3, by Olivier Megaton
Le Voyage du ballon rouge, by Hou Hsiao-hsien

2009
Une affaire d'État, by Éric Valete
Le Bal des actrices, by Maiwenn Le Besco
Banlieue 13 - Ultimatum, by Patrick Alessandrin
Coco avant Chanel, by Anne Fontaine
Coco Chanel & Igor Stravinsky, by Jan Kounen
Commis d'office, by Hannelore Cayre
Le Concert, by Radu Mihaileanu
Eden à l'ouest, by Costa-Gavras
Fais-moi plaisir !, by Emmanuel Mouret
La Folle Histoire d'amour de Simon Eskenazy, by Jean-Jacques Zilbermann
Les Herbes folles, by Alain Resnais
Le Hérisson, by Mona Achache
La horde, by Benjamin Rocher and Yannick Dahan
Micmacs à tire-larigot, by Jean-Pierre Jeunet
Le Petit Nicolas, by Laurent Tirard
Un Prophète, by Jacques Audiard
Une semaine sur deux (et la moitié des vacances scolaires), by Ivan Calbérac
R.T.T., by Frédéric Berthe
Rapt, by Lucas Belvaux

2010

2010
L'amour c'est mieux à deux, by Arnaud Lemort and Dominique Farrugia
Bus Palladium, by Christopher Thompson
The Extraordinary Adventures of Adèle Blanc-Sec, by Luc Besson
Gainsbourg (vie héroïque), by Joann Sfar
L'Illusionniste, by Sylvain Chomet
L'Immortel, by Richard Berry
Le Nom des gens, by Michel Leclerc
La Rafle, by Roselyne Bosch
Tout ce qui brille, by Géraldine Nakache and Hervé Mimran

2011
L'Apollonide: Souvenirs de la maison close, by Bertrand Bonello
Les Bien-Aimés, by Christophe Honoré
La Délicatesse, by Stéphane Foenkinos and David Foenkinos
La femme du Vème, by Paweł Pawlikowski
La guerre est déclarée, by Valérie Donzelli
Intouchables, by Olivier Nakache and Éric Toledano
Un Monstre a Paris, by Bibo Bergeron
Omar m'a tuer, by Roschdy Zem
Polisse, by Maïwenn
Les Trois Pères, by Didier Bourdon and Bernard Campan

2012
Cloclo, by Florent Emilio Siri
Les Infidèles, by Emmanuelle Bercot, Michel Hazanavicius, Jean Dujardin and Gilles Lellouche
JC comme Jésus Christ, by Jonathan Zaccaï
La Vérité si je mens ! 3, by Thomas Gilou
Holy Motors, by Leos Carax

Foreign films set entirely or partially in Paris

1910s
The Darling of Paris (1917), by J. Gordon Edwards

1920s
Camille (1921), by Ray C. Smallwood
The Four Horsemen of the Apocalypse (1921), by Rex Ingram
Orphans of the Storm (1921), by D.W. Griffith
Peacock Alley (1921), by Robert Z. Leonard
The Three Musketeers (1921), by Fred Niblo
Esmeralda (1922), by Edwin J. Collins
The Hunchback of Notre Dame (1923), by Wallace Worsley
A Woman of Paris (1923), by Charlie Chaplin
The Merry Widow (1923), by Erich von Stroheim
The Phantom of the Opera (1925), by Rupert Julian
La Bohème (1926), by King Vidor
Paris (1926), by Edmund Goulding
The Temptress (1926), by Fred Niblo
Seventh Heaven (1927), by Frank Borzage
The Iron Mask (1929), by Allan Dwan

1930s
Half Shot at Sunrise (1930), by Paul Sloane
Inspiration (1931), by Clarence Brown
The Last Flight (1931), by William Dieterle
Man of the World (1931), by Richard Wallace
Mata Hari (1931), by George Fitzmaurice
The Phantom of Paris (1931), by John S. Robertson
Seed (1931), by John M. Stahl
Arsène Lupin (1932), by Jack Conway
Love Me Tonight (1932), by Rouben Mamoulian
Murders in the Rue Morgue (1932), by Robert Florey
One Hour with You (1932), by George Cukor and Ernst Lubitsch
The Passionate Plumber (1932), by Edward Sedgwick
Trouble in Paradise (1932), by Ernst Lubitsch
A Bedtime Story (1933), by Norman Taurog
Design for Living (1933), by Ernst Lubitsch
Bolero (1934), by Wesley Ruggles
The Count of Monte Cristo, by Rowland V. Lee
Fashions of 1934 (1934), by William Dieterle
The Merry Widow (1934), by Ernst Lubitsch
Folies Bergère de Paris (1935), by Roy Del Ruth
Mad Love (1935), by Karl Freund
Peter Ibbetson (1935), by Henry Hathaway
Roberta (1935), by William A. Seiter
Ruggles of Red Gap (1935), by Leo McCarey
A Tale of Two Cities (1935), by Jack Conway
The Three Musketeers (1935), by Rowland V. Lee
Desire (1936), by Frank Borzage
The Devil-Doll (1936), by Tod Browning
Camille (1936), by George Cukor
The Story of Louis Pasteur (1936), by William Dieterle
Angel (1937), by Ernst Lubitsch
Café Metropole (1937), by Edward H. Griffith
I Met Him in Paris (1937), by Wesley Ruggles
The Life of Emile Zola (1937), by William Dieterle
Stolen Holiday (1937), by Michael Curtiz
Tovarich (1937), by Anatole Litvak
Mad About Music (1938), by Norman Taurog
The Flying Deuces (1939), by A. Edward Sutherland
The Hunchback of Notre Dame (1939), by William Dieterle
The Man in the Iron Mask (1939), by James Whale
Midnight (1939), by Mitchell Leisen
Ninotchka (1939), by Ernst Lubitsch
The Story of Vernon and Irene Castle (1939), by H. C. Potter
Zaza (1939), by George Cukor

1940s
Arise, My Love (1940), by Mitchell Leisen
Ohm Krüger (1941), by Hans Steinhoff
Casablanca (1942), by Michael Curtiz 
Joan of Paris (1942), by Robert Stevenson
Once Upon a Honeymoon (1942), by Leo McCarey
Reunion in France (1942), by Jules Dassin
Madame Curie (1943), by Mervyn LeRoy
Phantom of the Opera (1943), by Arthur Lubin
Bluebeard (1944), by Edgar G. Ulmer
A Song to Remember (1945), by Charles Vidor
A Scandal in Paris (1946), by Douglas Sirk
Berlin Express (1947), by Jacques Tourneur
The Private Affairs of Bel Ami (1947), by Albert Lewin
Arch of Triumph (1948), by Lewis Milestone
The Three Musketeers (1948), by George Sidney
Reign of Terror (1949), by Anthony Mann

1950s
An American in Paris (1951), by Vincente Minnelli
The Lavender Hill Mob (1951), by Charles Crichton
Rich, Young and Pretty (1951), by Norman Taurog
April in Paris (1952), by David Butler
Lovely to Look At (1952), by Mervyn LeRoy
The Merry Widow (1952), by Curtis Bernhardt
Les Misérables (1952), by Lewis Milestone
Monte Carlo Baby (1952), by Jean Boyer
Moulin Rouge (1952), by John Huston
Scaramouche (1952), by George Sidney
Act of Love (1953), by Anatole Litvak
Innocents in Paris (1953), by Gordon Parry
Little Boy Lost (1953), by George Seaton
Daddy Long Legs (1954), by Jean Negulesco
Désirée (1954), by Henry Koster
The French Line (1954), by Lloyd Bacon
The Last Time I Saw Paris (1954), by Richard Brooks
Phantom of the Rue Morgue (1954), by Roy Del Ruth
Sabrina (1954), by Billy Wilder
The French, They Are a Funny Race (1955), by Preston Sturges
So This Is Paris (1955), by Richard Quine
Anything Goes (1956), by Robert Lewis
Trapeze (1956), by Carol Reed
Funny Face (1957), by Stanley Donen
Love From Paris (1957), by Helmut Käutner
Love in the Afternoon (1957), by Billy Wilder
Silk Stockings (1957), by Rouben Mamoulian
The Sun Also Rises (1957), by Henry King
A Certain Smile (1958), by Jean Negulesco
Gigi (1958), by Vincente Minnelli
Paris Holiday (1958), by Gerd Oswald
The Perfect Furlough (1958), by Blake Edwards

1960s
Can-Can (1960), by Walter Lang
Goodbye Again (1961), by Anatole Litvak
Paris Blues (1961), by Martin Ritt
Four Horsemen of the Apocalypse (1962), by Vincente Minnelli
Gay Purr-ee (1962), by Abe Levitow
Gigot (1962), by Gene Kelly
Charade (1963), by Stanley Donen
A New Kind of Love (1963), by Melville Shavelson
The Pink Panther (1963), by Blake Edwards
Take Her, She's Mine (1963), by Henry Koster
Paris When It Sizzles (1964), by Richard Quine
A Shot in the Dark (1964), by Blake Edwards
’’What A Way To Go ‘’ (1964)
Boeing Boeing (1965), by John Rich
The Great Race (1965), by Blake Edwards
Thunderball (1965) by Terence Young
What's New Pussycat? (1965), by Clive Donner and Richard Talmadge
How to Steal a Million (1966), by William Wyler
Made in Paris (1966), by Boris Sagal
Caprice (1967), by Frank Tashlin
The Night of the Generals (1967), by Anatole Litvak
Woman Times Seven (1967), by Vittorio De Sica
Destroy All Monsters (1968), by Yoshio Tsuchiya
The Madwoman of Chaillot (1968), by Bryan Forbes

1970s
The Aristocats (1970), by Wolfgang Reitherman
Darling Lili (1970), by Blake Edwards
Start the Revolution Without Me (1970), by Bud Yorkin
Tropic of Cancer (1970), by Joseph Strick
Murders in the Rue Morgue (1971), by Gordon Hessler
Paris and Love (1972), by Mohamed Salman
Travels with My Aunt (1972), by George Cukor
Ultimo tango a Parigi (1972), by Bernardo Bertolucci
The Day of the Jackal (1973), by Fred Zinnemann
Scorpio (1973), by Michael Winner
The Three Musketeers (1973), by Richard Lester
Two People (1973), by Robert Wise
The Pink Panther Strikes Again (1976), by Blake Edwards
Marathon Man (1976), by John Schlesinger
The American Friend (1977), by Wim Wenders
Herbie Goes to Monte Carlo (1977), by Vincent McEveety
Bloodline (1979), by Terence Young
Last Tango in Paris (1972), by Bertolucci
A Little Romance (1979), by George Roy Hill

1980s
Bon Voyage, Charlie Brown (and Don't Come Back!!) (1980), by Charles M. Schulz
Superman II (1980), by Richard Donner & Richard Lester
Condorman (1981), by Charles Jarrott
Lenin in Paris (1981), by Sergei Yutkevich
Trail of the Pink Panther (1982), by Blake Edwards
Victor Victoria (1982), by Blake Edwards
Curse of the Pink Panther (1983), by Blake Edwards
La Traviata (1983), by Franco Zeffirelli
American Dreamer (1984), by Rick Rosenthal
National Lampoon's European Vacation, (1985), by Amy Heckerling
Target (1985), by Arthur Penn
A View to a Kill (1985), by John Glen
Round Midnight (1986), by Bertrand Tavernier
Dangerous Liaisons (1988), by Stephen Frears
Frantic (1988), by Roman Polanski
The Moderns (1988), by Alan Rudolph
Sweet Lies (1988), by Robert Palmer

1990s
Henry & June (1990), by Philip Kaufman
The Favour, the Watch and the Very Big Fish (1991), by Ben Lewin
Night on Earth (1991), by Jim Jarmusch
Bitter Moon (1992), by Roman Polanski
Window To Paris (1993), by Yuri Mamin
Killing Zoe (1994), by Roger Avary
Prêt-à-Porter (1994), by Robert Altman
Delta of Venus (1995), by Zalman King
Forget Paris (1995), by Billy Crystal
French Kiss (1995), by Lawrence Kasdan
Jefferson in Paris (1995), by James Ivory
Sabrina (1995), by Sydney Pollack
Surviving Picasso (1995), by James Ivory
Total Eclipse (1995), by Agnieszka Holland
La Buena vida (1996), by David Trueba
Everyone Says I Love You (1996), by Woody Allen
The Hunchback of Notre Dame (1996), by Gary Trousdale & Kirk Wise
An American Werewolf in Paris (1997), by Anthony Waller
Anastasia (1997), by Don Bluth and Gary Goldman
Love in Paris (1997), by Anne Goursaud
Metroland (1997), by Philip Saville
Deep Impact (1998), by Mimi Leder
Madeline (1998), by Daisy von Scherler Mayer
The Man in the Iron Mask (1998), by Randall Wallace
The Ninth Gate (1999), by Roman Polanski
Passport to Paris (1999), by Alan Metter
Ronin (1998), by John Frankenheimer

2000s

2000
102 Dalmatians, by Kevin Lima
Final Destination, by James Wong
Rugrats in Paris: The Movie, by Stig Bergqvist and Paul Demeyer

2001
Monsters, Inc. by Pete Docter
CQ, by Roman Coppola
The Emperor's New Clothes, by Alan Taylor
Kiss of the Dragon, by Chris Nahon
Moulin Rouge!, by Baz Luhrmann

2002
The Bourne Identity, by Doug Liman
Femme Fatale, by Brian De Palma
The Hunchback of Notre Dame II, by Bradley Raymond
The Truth About Charlie, by Jonathan Demme

2003
Remake, by Dino Mustafić
Le Divorce, by James Ivory
Les Innocents, by Bernardo Bertolucci
Looney Tunes: Back in Action, by Joe Dante
Final Destination 2, by David Richard Ellis
Something's Gotta Give, by Nancy Meyers
Winged Migration, by Jacques Perrin

2004
Before Sunset, by Richard Linklater
Devil Man, by Hisato Izaki
Eurotrip, by Jeff Schaffer
Godzilla: Final Wars, by Ryuhei Kitamura
Flyboys, by Tony Bill
Head in the Clouds, by John Duigan
Hum Tum, by Kunal Kohli
The Phantom of the Opera, by Joel Schumacher
Team America: World Police, by Trey Parker

2005
Deuce Bigalow: European Gigolo, by Mike Bigelow
Munich, by Steven Spielberg
Ninette, by José Luis Garci

2006
Da Vinci Code, by Ron Howard
The Devil Wears Prada, by David Frankel
Don: The Chase Begins Again, by Farhan Akhtar
Französisch für Anfänger, by Christian Ditter
Marie Antoinette, by Sofia Coppola
Paris, je t'aime, Anthology film
Perfume: The Story of a Murderer, by Tom Tykwer
The Pink Panther, by Shawn Levy

2007
2 Days in Paris, by Julie Delpy
The Bourne Ultimatum, by Paul Greengrass
Broken English, by Zoe Cassavetes
Chill Out, Scooby-Doo!, by Joe Sichta
Jhoom Barabar Jhoom, by Shaad Ali
Mr. Bean's Holiday, by Steve Bendelack
National Treasure: Book of Secrets, by Jon Turteltaub
Ratatouille, by Brad Bird
Rush Hour 3, by Brett Ratner

2008
Disaster Movie, by Jason Friedberg and Aaron Seltzer
Taken, by Pierre Morel

2009
Cheri, by Stephen Frears
An Education, by Lone Scherfig
G.I. Joe: The Rise of Cobra, by Stephen Sommers
Inglourious Basterds, by Quentin Tarantino
Julie & Julia, by Nora Ephron
Nodame Cantabile, by Hideki Takeuchi and Taisuke Kawamura
The Pink Panther 2, by Harald Zwart

2010s

2010
The Absinthe Drinkers, by John Charles Jopson
From Paris with Love, by Pierre Morel
Hereafter, by Clint Eastwood
Inception, by Christopher Nolan
The Tourist, by Florian Henckel von Donnersmarck

2011
After Fall, Winter, by Eric Schaeffer
Bitch, by Lou Ye
Cars 2, by John Lasseter
Engeyum Kaadhal, by Prabhu Deva
Final Destination 5, by Steven Quale
For Lovers Only, by Michael Polish and Mark Polish
Hugo, by Martin Scorsese
Midnight in Paris, by Woody Allen
A Monster in Paris, by Bebo Bergeron
Monte Carlo, by Tom Bezucha
Paris Connections, by Harley Cokeliss
Sherlock Holmes: A Game of Shadows, by Guy Ritchie

2012
Bel-Ami, by Declan Donnellan and Nick Ormerod
The Woman in the Fifth, by Pawel Pawlikowski
LOL, by Lisa Azuelos

2013
The Smurfs 2, by Raja Gosnell
Le Week-End, by Roger Michell

2014
The Xpose

2015
An American Girl: Grace Stirs Up Success, by Vince Marcello
Tomorrowland, by Brad Bird

2018
Steven Universe Sees Paris: The Movie, by Jasmin Lai and Ian Jones-Quartey
 Mission: Impossible – Fallout, by Christopher McQuarrie
 Fantastic Beasts: The Crimes of Grindelwald, by David Yates and J.K. Rowling

Paris destroyed on film
The War of the Worlds (1953), by Byron Haskin
Destroy All Monsters (1968)
Superman II (1980), by Richard Lester
Independence Day (1996), by Roland Emmerich
Mars Attacks! (1996), by Tim Burton
Armageddon (1998), by Michael Bay
Team America: World Police (2004), by Trey Parker
Godzilla: Final Wars (2004)
Supernova (2005), by John Harrison
28 Weeks Later (2007), by Juan Carlos Fresnadillo
The Day the Earth Stopped (2008), by C. Thomas Howell
Transformers: Revenge of the Fallen (2008), by Michael Bay
Cloudy with a Chance of Meatballs (2009), by Phil Lord and Christopher Miller
G.I. Joe: The Rise of Cobra (2009), by Stephen Sommers
Edge of Tomorrow (2014), by Doug Liman

References

 
Paris
films set
Paris